Araik Ambartsumov is a Russian amateur boxer of Armenian descent who won the silver medal at the 2008 European Amateur Boxing Championships in the featherweight division.

Russian national championships
Ambartsumov won a gold medal in the 2008 featherweight Russian senior national championships beating Ruslan Kamilov in the final by 6:4.

European Amateur Championships
Following his victory in the national championships Ambartsumov then represented Russia at the 2008 European Amateur Boxing Championships in Liverpool, England. He won a silver medal after losing to the Ukraine's Vasyl Lomachenko 7:1 in the final.

European Championships results
2008 (as a Featherweight)
Preliminary round - BYE
Second round Defeated Alessio di Savino (Italy) 4:1
Quarter Finals Defeated Mirsa Ahmeti (Albania) 13:0
Semi Finals Defeated Bashir Hassan (Sweden) 9:2
Finals Lost to Vasyl Lomachenko (Ukraine) 7:1

References

1983 births
Living people
Featherweight boxers
Ethnic Armenian sportspeople
Russian sportspeople of Armenian descent
Russian male boxers